Voderady is a village and municipality of Trnava District in the Trnava region of Slovakia. Voderady is located in the near of Samsung LCD production facility. The village itself is connected through motorway exit to Bratislava and Trnava.

Etymology
The name comes from the Slovak voderadi meaning "servants in the service of the lordship obliged to maintain drainage canals".

Notable people
 Justín Javorek, football player and coach
 Renáta Zmajkovičová, politician

References

External links

 Official page
Voderady History: https://voderady-info.webnode.sk

Villages and municipalities in Trnava District